Pangburn is a city in White County, Arkansas, United States. The population was 500 at the 2020 census.

Geography

Demographics

At the 2000 census there were 654 people in 275 households, including 188 families, in the city. The racial makeup of the city was 98.78% White, 0.15% Black or African American, 0.15% Native American, 0.61% from other races, and 0.31% from two or more races. 1.53% of the population were Hispanic or Latino of any race.
Of the 275 households 30.5% had children under the age of 18 living with them, 49.1% were married couples living together, 16.0% had a female householder with no husband present, and 31.6% were non-families. 28.4% of households were one person and 16.4% were one person aged 65 or older. The average household size was 2.38 and the average family size was 2.88.

The age distribution was 28.0% under the age of 18, 8.1% from 18 to 24, 25.1% from 25 to 44, 20.8% from 45 to 64, and 18.0% 65 or older. The median age was 36 years. For every 100 females, there were 87.4 males. For every 100 females age 18 and over, there were 84.0 males.

The median household income was $25,735 and the median family income  was $31,250. Males had a median income of $26,750 versus $18,594 for females. The per capita income for the city was $15,234. About 10.1% of families and 15.9% of the population were below the poverty line, including 23.2% of those under age 18 and 16.3% of those age 65 or over.

Education 
Public education is provided to elementary and secondary school students by the Pangburn School District, which includes Pangburn High School.

References

Cities in White County, Arkansas
Cities in Arkansas